Džūkste Parish is an administrative unit of Tukums Municipality in the Semigallia region of Latvia. The administrative center is Džūkste.

Towns, villages and settlements of Džūkste parish 
 Džūkste
 Lancenieki
 Pienava

See also 
 Džūkste Station

References

External links

Parishes of Latvia
Tukums Municipality
Semigallia